Silvaco Group, Inc., develops and markets electronic design automation (EDA) and technology CAD (TCAD) software and semiconductor design IP (SIP).  The company is headquartered in Santa Clara, California, and has a global presence with offices located in North America, Europe, and throughout Asia.  Since its founding in 1984, Silvaco has grown to become a large privately held EDA company.  The company has been known by at least two other names: Silvaco International, and Silvaco Data Systems.

History

Founded by Dr. Ivan Pesic (13 September 1951, Resnik, Montenegro — 20 October 2012, Japan) in 1984, the company is privately held and internally funded. It is headquartered in Santa Clara, California, with fourteen offices worldwide.

In 2003 Silvaco acquired Simucad Inc., a privately held company founded in 1981 that provided logic simulation EDA software. Silvaco re-launched the brand by spinning out its EDA product line in 2006 under the Simucad name. As of 17 February 2010, Simucad Design Automation and Silvaco Data Systems were merged back together forming Silvaco, Inc.

In 2006, Silvaco sued Intel for misappropriation of trade secrets in the case of Silvaco Data Systems v. Intel Corp., however ultimately the judgment of the Court was in favor of Intel.

In 2012, David Halliday was appointed CEO after the death of the company founder Ivan Pesic.

In 2015, Silvaco appointed a new CEO, David Dutton. The company also acquired Invarian, Inc., a privately held company providing power integrity analysis software, and acquired Infiniscale SA, a privately held company in France providing variability analysis software.

In 2016, Silvaco added semiconductor design IP (SIP) to its portfolio with the acquisition of the privately held company IPextreme, Inc. Silvaco also entered into another new market segment with the acquisition of the privately held company edXact in France. The tools from edXact are used for analysis, reduction, and comparison of extracted parasitic netlists.

In 2017, Silvaco acquired SoC Solutions, a privately held company providing semiconductor IP.

In 2018, Silvaco acquired NanGate, a privately held company providing tools and services for creation, optimization, characterization, and validation of physical library IP. The company also announced a partnership with Purdue University and the Purdue Research Foundation for the commercialization of the NEMO tool suite, which is used for nanoelectronics modeling and atomistic simulation.

In 2019, Silvaco appointed Dr. Babak Taheri as its new Chief Executive Officer. Prior to his appointment, he was Silvaco's Chief Technical Officer.

In 2020, Silvaco acquired the assets of Coupling Wave Solutions S.A., a privately held company providing silicon substrate noise analysis software. Silvaco also acquired the memory compiler technologies and standard cell libraries of Dolphin Design.

Products
Silvaco delivers EDA and semiconductor TCAD software products and semiconductor design IP with support and engineering services. Worldwide customers include leading foundries, fabless semiconductor companies, OEMs, integrated semiconductor manufacturers, and universities.

TCAD Products
Process Simulation
Victory Process – 2D/3D process simulator
Device Simulation
Victory Device 2D/3D device simulator 
Other tools
Virtual Wafer Fab (VWF) – Emulation of wafer manufacturing to perform design-of-experiments and optimization.

EDA Products
The company supplies integrated EDA software in the areas of analog/mixed-signal/RF circuit simulation, custom IC CAD, interconnect modeling, and standard cell library development and characterization.

SPICE modeling and analog & mixed-signal simulation
 Utmost IV –  Device characterization and SPICE modeling
SmartSpice – Analog circuit simulator
 SmartSpice RF – Frequency and time domain RF circuit simulator
 SmartView – Simulation waveform viewer
Custom IC CAD
 Gateway – Schematic editor
 Expert – Layout editor
 Guardian – DRC/LVS/Net physical verification
 Hipex – Full-chip parasitic extraction
 Jivaro – Parasitic reduction and analysis
 VarMan – High-sigma variability analysis
Interconnect Modeling
 Clever – Parasitic extractor for realistic 3D structures
Library Platform
 Cello – Standard cell library creation, migration and optimization
 Viola – Standard cell library and I/O cell characterization
 Liberty Analyzer – Analysis and validation of timing, power, noise, and area data from characterization

SIP Products

The company markets a wide variety of semiconductor design IP (SIP). In May 2019, the company announced that the semiconductor design IP of Samsung Foundry (SF) is now marketed, licensed, and supported through Silvaco. 
SIP categories include:
 Interface PHYs
 Interface controllers
 Automotive controllers
 AMBA IP cores and subsystems
 Security cores
 Analog cores
 Embedded processors
 Analog front-ends and codecs
 Foundation IP
 Standard cell libraries
 Embedded memories
 I/Os

References

Electronic design automation companies
Companies based in Santa Clara, California
Software companies established in 1984
1984 establishments in California